Jonathan Mann is the name of:

Jonathan Mann (WHO official) (1947–1998), former head of the World Health Organization's global AIDS program, who is also the namesake of the WHO Jonathan Mann Award
Jonathan Mann (journalist) (born 1960), journalist for CNN
Jonathan Mann (musician) (born 1982), musician and YouTube personality

See also
John Mann (disambiguation)
 Mann (surname)